The Musée Nissim de Camondo is a historic house museum of French decorative arts located in the Hôtel Camondo at 63, rue de Monceau, on the edge of Parc Monceau, in the 8th arrondissement of Paris, France. The nearest Paris Métro stops are Villiers and Monceau on Line 2.

The Paris Convention and Visitors Bureau describes the museum as housing "a spectacular collection of French decorative art from the second half of the 18th century. Admire Aubusson tapestries, canvases by Élisabeth Vigée-Lebrun or items that once belonged to Marie-Antoinette. Also on display, a collection of Sèvres porcelain and furniture by cabinetmakers Riesener and Oeben".

History
The mansion was built in 1911 by Count Moïse de Camondo, a banker, with architect René Sergent, to set off his collection of eighteenth-century French furniture and art objects. Its design was patterned on the Petit Trianon at Versailles, though with modern conveniences. On his death in 1935, it was announced that both the house and its collections were bequeathed to Les Arts Décoratifs in honour of his son, Nissim de Camondo, killed in World War I. The house opened as a museum in 1936. 

More tragedy followed a few years later when Moïse's daughter and her family were deported to the Auschwitz concentration camp. A plaque in the house states that in 1944, Béatrice de Camondo, her husband Léon Reinach, and their two children, Fanny and Bertrand all died in the concentration camp. The Camondo family was a Sephardic Jewish clan. Moïse's widow Irène survived by escaping to a villa in the south of France.

Today, the house is maintained as if it were still a private home preserved in its original condition. Three floors are open to visitors: the lower ground floor (kitchens), upper ground floor (formal rooms), first floor (private apartments), and gardens. Outbuildings are also included, built in 1863 and enlarged by Comte Nissim de Camondo; they were later modified by Moïse.

The house's furnishings include needlepoint chairs and work by artisans of the Garde-Meuble de la Couronne (Royal Furniture Repository) such as Jean-François Oeben, Jean Henri Riesener, and Georges Jacob. Floors are furnished with Savonnerie carpets woven in 1678 for the Grande Galerie in the Louvre.

The walls are accented with tapestries (many Beauvais or Aubusson) and paintings, including portraits by Élisabeth-Louise Vigée Le Brun, landscapes by Guardi and Hubert Robert, and hunting scenes by Jean-Baptiste Oudry. Table settings are of particular interest, especially the Orloff silver dinner service commissioned by Catherine II of Russia from silversmith Jacques-Nicolas Roettiers in 1770, and the Buffon porcelain services made at Sèvres in the 1780s with a bird theme. Other notable objects include a bust by Jean-Antoine Houdon, bas-reliefs, Chinese vases, and crystal chandeliers.

As of February 2020, the museum remained closed due to the worldwide COVID-19 pandemic.

As of May 2022, the museum is open, after having been closed in February 2020 due to the worldwide COVID-19 pandemic.

In the popular media
The house was the location for filming some scenes for Lupin (TV series) standing in for the home of the fictional, wealthy Pellegrini family. Locations included in the television series include the "grounds outside the house, inside the house, and also on the roof".

Gallery

See also 
 List of museums in Paris

References 

 The Nissim de Camondo Museum, by Sylvie Legrand-Rossi, Paris:Les Arts Décoratifs, 2009.
 The Camondo Legacy. The passions of a Paris Collector, directed by Marie-Noël de Gary, photographs by Jean-Marie del Moral, London:Thames & Hudson, 2008.
 The Nissim de Camondo Museum, by Nadine Gasc, Gérard Mabille, Paris: Musées et Monuments de France : Albin Michel, 1997.
 Musée Nissim de Camondo: catalogue des collections, by Jean Messelet, Bertrand Rondot, Xavier Salmon, Béatrice Quette, Paris : Réunion des musées nationaux: Union centrale des arts décoratifs, 1998. .

External links 

 Musée Nissim de Camondo  (detailed)
 Musée Nissim de Camondo  (overview)

Buildings and structures completed in 1911
Art museums established in 1935
Art museums and galleries in Paris
Camondo, Nissim de
Decorative arts museums in France
Historic house museums in Paris
Buildings and structures in the 8th arrondissement of Paris
1935 establishments in France
Les Arts Décoratifs
Nissim de Camondo
House of Camondo
20th-century architecture in France